Atrophaneura horishana, the aurora swallowtail, is a species of butterfly from the family Papilionidae that is found in Taiwan.

The wingspan is 110–130 mm. The wings are black. The body has red hairs. There is a large red patch on the underside of each hindwing. The wing veins are bordered in white.

Biology
Adults visit flowers. The eggs are yellow and spherical. The larvae have prominent tubercles, a whitish black ground colour and two white bands on the third and fourth abdominal segments. The larvae feed on species of Aristolochia - A. shimadai and A. liukiuensis. It is in general found at 1000–2500 m in elevation and is only abundant in primary forests.

Status
Common, but status should be monitored.

Taxonomy
Has been ranked as a subspecies of Atrophaneura nox.

References

External links
Image representing Atrophaneura horishana at EOL
Global Butterfly Information System text and images including holotype of sauteri Heyne, 1913

Butterflies described in 1910
Atrophaneura
Lepidoptera of Taiwan
Endemic fauna of Taiwan
Taxa named by Shōnen Matsumura